WASP-50 is a G-type main-sequence star about 610 light-years away. The star is older than the Sun and slightly depleted in heavy elements compared to the Sun, and has a close to average starspot activity. Despite its advanced age, the star is rotating rapidly, being spun up by the tides raised by giant planet on close orbit.

The star was named Chaophraya in December 2019 by the Thai amateur astronomers.

Planetary system
In 2011 a transiting hot superjovian planet b (named Maeping in 2019) was detected. It has an equilibrium temperature of  1405 K.

References

Eridanus (constellation)
G-type main-sequence stars
Planetary systems with one confirmed planet
Planetary transit variables
J02544513-1053530